Tall-e Mishan (also Romanized as Tall-e Mīshān) is a village in Kahir Rural District, in the Central District of Konarak County, Sistan and Baluchestan Province, Iran. At the 2006 census, its population was 317, in 46 families.

References 

Populated places in Konarak County